The Gabala FC 2010–11 season was Gabala's fifth Azerbaijan Premier League season, which they finished in 7th position. They were knocked out of the Azerbaijan Cup by Baku at the Quarter Finals stage. It was their first season Tony Adams as their manager.

Squad

(captain)

Transfers

Summer

In:

 

 

 

 
 

Out:

Winter

In:

Out:

Released

Competitions

Azerbaijan Premier League

Results

League table

Azerbaijan Premier League Relegation Group

Results

Table

Azerbaijan Cup

Squad statistics

Appearances and goals

 

|-
|colspan="14"|Players who appeared for Gabala who left during the season:

|}

Goal scorers

Disciplinary record

References
Qarabağ have played their home games at the Tofiq Bahramov Stadium since 1993 due to the ongoing situation in Quzanlı.

External links 
Gabala FC website
Gabala FC at UEFA.com
Gabala FC at Soccerway.com
Gabala FC at National Football Teams.com

Gabala FC seasons
Gabala